Geoffrey Chadsey (born March 23, 1967) is an American artist known for his painting and drawings, based in Brooklyn, New York. He is best known for his depictions of men, consisting of dense curving and parallel lines reminiscent of engraving to delineate imperfect bodies that often shift between genders.

Biography 
Chadsey was born in Philadelphia, Pennsylvania.  In 1989, he received an AB in visual and environmental studies from Harvard University, and in 1995, an MFA in Photography and Drawing from California College of the Arts.

His conspicuously flawed bodies are often androgynous, as in Portrait II, in the collection of the Honolulu Museum of Art. The Honolulu Museum of Art and the San Francisco Museum of Modern Art are among the public collections holding work by Geoffrey Chadsey.

References
 Bowers, Keith, “Geoff Chadsey Exposes Private Horror in ‘shift, return’ at Electric Works”, SFWeekly, Feb. 8, 2011
 Chadsey, Geoffrey, James Jensen; David A. M. Goldberg, Boys in the Band: Geoffrey Chadsey Drawings 1998-2006, The Contemporary Museum, Honolulu, 2006
 Cheng, Dewitt. “This Month’s Top Exhibitions in the Western United States––Electric Works Gallery, San Francisco, California”, Huffington Post, Jan. 28, 2011
 Morse, Marcia. “Geoffrey Chadsey at the Contemporary Museum”, Art in America, Nov. 2007, p. 230.

Footnotes

20th-century American painters
Modern painters
American LGBT artists
Harvard University alumni
California College of the Arts alumni
1967 births
Living people
Artists from Philadelphia
21st-century American painters